The Tree of Life is a 1986 adventure module for the Dungeons & Dragons roleplaying game.  Its associated code is CM7.

Plot synopsis 
The Tree of Life is an adventure scenario for elf player characters who seek a cure for the ailment which is killing their Tree of Life.

The Feadiel clan's Tree of Life is dying. The best warriors in the clan are recruited to cure the tree; if it dies, all the elves will perish as well. The elves soon go to the deepest part of ancient Selinar, Elvenhome, to find the guarded grave of the first Treekeeper.

Publication history
CM7 The Tree of Life was written by Bruce A. Heard, with a cover by Larry Elmore, and was published by TSR in 1986 as a 32-page booklet with an outer folder.

Reception

See also
 List of Dungeons & Dragons modules

References

External links
The "CM" modules from The Acaeum

Dungeons & Dragons modules
Mystara
Role-playing game supplements introduced in 1986